Robert Black "Buff" Wilson (19 August 1868 – 19 November 1947) was a Scottish professional golfer who played in the late 19th and early 20th century. Wilson placed ninth in the 1896 U.S. Open, held 18 July at Shinnecock Hills Golf Club in Southampton, New York. He played in the 1897 U.S. Open and finished T11. He had two starts in the Open Championship, in 1890 and 1893, and finished in 22nd and 33rd place, respectively.

Early life
Wilson was born on 19 August 1868 in Anstruther, Scotland. He was in business as a clubmaker in the 1890s and produced fine long-nosed woods. He carved his signature on the clubs he made in an oval configuration on the top of the clubhead, the markings reading: "R B Wilson, Maker, St Andrews". He learned his trade as a clubmaker when he apprenticed under Old Tom Morris at St Andrews. He obtained patents on several of his golf club designs, including a mashie-cleek for approach shots; it was a popular item in his shop—he sold 1,200 clubs in 1898 alone.

He first posting as a professional was at Minchinhampton where he also designed the course. After intermediate stops at Sheffield, Sidcup, and Beckenham he set sail for the United States and took up a posting at Shinnecock Hills Golf Club, Long Island. He also worked at Lakewood Golf Club in New Jersey. In the winter months he always returned to St Andrews and went back into his workshop producing more clubs, most of which he exported to the U.S. He was posted at the Wentorf Reinbek Club in Germany in 1905 but stayed only a short time before returning to Scotland.

Golf career

1896 U.S. Open
Wilson placed ninth in the 1896 U.S. Open, held 18 July at Shinnecock Hills Golf Club in Southampton, New York. He carded rounds of 82-80=162. James Foulis won the tournament, three strokes ahead of runner-up Horace Rawlins, the defending champion.

Death
Wilson died on 19 November 1947 in Cupar, Scotland, at the age of 79.

Results in major championships

Note: Wilson only played in the Open Championship and the U.S. Open.
NYF = Tournament not yet founded
DNP = Did not play
WD = Withdrew
? = finish unknown
"T" indicates a tie for a place
Yellow background for top-10

References

Scottish male golfers
Scottish emigrants to the United States
People from Anstruther
1868 births
1947 deaths